Ulf Österberg is a Swedish-American physicist specializing in optical fibers, nonlinear optics, and ultrafast and THz spectroscopy. With Walter Margulis, he discovered efficient second-harmonic generation in optical fibers, and his optical precursor studies are particular noteworthy.

Early life and education
Österberg was born in Göteborg, Sweden in 1958, and spent his early years in Trollhättan. He received his MS from Chalmers University of Technology (Engineering Physics) in 1982, and the PhD from the KTH Royal Institute of Technology (Physics) in 1987.

Research and career
Österberg was a visiting researcher with J. Roy Taylor at Imperial College during his PhD, and held a postdoctoral position at the University of Arizona College of Optical Sciences, and was a National Research Council Fellow at the Seiler Research Laboratory, US Air Force Academy, Colorado Springs.  He was on the faculty of the Thayer School of Engineering at Dartmouth College from 1990-2009, during which time he was a recipient of a Presidential Young Investigator Award from NSF.  He received patents on signal encryption methodology  using wavelet transforms, and co-founded Lightkey Optical Components, LLC.  He also studied optical precursors.
In 2009 he moved to the Norwegian University of Science and Technology (NTNU) in Trondheim, Norway, and was inducted into Norges Tekniske VitenskapsAcademi (NTVA), a science and technology organization dating from 1955.  His work at NTNU was on broadband THz generation and spectroscopy. His continued interest in pedagogy inspired a return to Dartmouth Engineering in 2018.  He is an adjunct faculty member at the KTH Royal Institute of Technology in Stockholm, Sweden.

Personal life
Österberg is married to Ursula Gibson, and they have three children.

Published works
He is the author or coauthor of >120 publications, with >3600 citations.

References

Swedish physicists
Chalmers University of Technology alumni
1958 births
Living people